Bresnik may refer to:

 Bresnik (Kraljevo), a village in Serbia
 Bresnik (Prokuplje), a village in Serbia